Regulator of G-protein signaling 20 is a protein that in humans is encoded by the RGS20 gene.

Regulator of G protein signaling (RGS) proteins are regulatory and structural components of G protein-coupled receptor complexes. RGS proteins are GTPase-activating proteins for Gi (see GNAI1; MIM 139310) and Gq (see GNAQ; MIM 600998) class G-alpha proteins. They accelerate transit through the cycle of GTP binding and hydrolysis and thereby accelerate signaling kinetics and termination.[supplied by OMIM]

In melanocytic cells RGS20 gene expression may be regulated by MITF.

Interactions 

RGS20 has been shown to interact with GNAO1 and GNAZ.

References

Further reading